English musician Paul McCartney has participated in a number of concert tours across several eras of his musical career. With the British–American rock band Wings, he undertook five major tours, with one, the Wings Over the World tour, being worldwide. Following Wings' final 1979 tour of the UK, McCartney did not undergo a major concert tour for ten years. As a solo artist, McCartney has undergone sixteen major concert tours, nine being worldwide. His first was The Paul McCartney World Tour (1989–90) and his most recent being the 2022 Got Back tour.

With Wings

The British–American rock band Wings was Paul McCartney's post-Beatles band who were active from 1971 to 1981. Their primary line-up was McCartney, his wife Linda and guitarist Denny Laine, formerly of the Moody Blues. Throughout their years as a band, they embarked on a number of concert tours, varying in scale from their initial "DIY" tour of British universities to the epic Wings Over the World tour.

Shortly after forming Wings, the McCartneys took the band on an impromptu tour of the United Kingdom's universities in early 1972, showing up unannounced and performing for whoever happened to be on campus. The band's intended first stop on the tour, Ashby-de-la-Zouch, refused to allow them to play, so the band moved on to the more receptive University of Nottingham. Admission to the first show was £0.50, proceeds being split up equally among the band members.

The last Concert for the People of Kampuchea on 29 December 1979, which was the final date of Wings' fifth tour, was Wings' final gig.

However, Wings achieved notoriety for its aborted sixth tour, a January 1980 tour of Japan, which was cancelled before it even started when Paul McCartney was arrested for possession of marijuana while entering Japan on 16 January 1980 and was eventually deported on 25 January after nine days in prison, without Wings ever performing.  Wings never again attempted a tour prior to their breakup in 1981.

List of Wings tours
Wings University Tour – 11 shows in the UK, 1972
Wings Over Europe Tour – 26 shows throughout Europe, 1972
Wings 1973 UK Tour – 21 shows in the UK, 1973
Wings Over the World tour – 66 shows over the world, 1975–1976
Wings UK Tour 1979 – 19 shows in the UK, 1979 + 1 show on 29 December 1979 (the last of the 4 Concerts for the People of Kampuchea)

Solo

Solo tours

Solo unique shows

Timeline members

See also 
 List of highest-grossing live music artists

References

 
Lists of concert tours